Charlie Clark (1 June 1883 – 1954) was a British cyclist. He competed in the 5000 metres event at the 1908 Summer Olympics.

References

External links
 

1883 births
1954 deaths
British male cyclists
Olympic cyclists of Great Britain
Cyclists at the 1908 Summer Olympics
Place of birth missing